Moreau is a French surname. Notable people with the surname include:

Adrien Moreau (1843–1906), French genre and historical painter, sculptor and illustrator
Alicia Moreau (1885–1986), Argentine politician and activist 
Auguste Francois Moreau (1860–1910), prominent Victorian and Art Nouveau sculptor
Art Moreau, American politician
Arthur S. Moreau Jr. (1931-1986), American Military Leader
Basil Anthony Marie Moreau (1799–1873), French priest
Cecilia Moreau, Argentine politician
Charles Paul Narcisse Moreau (1837–1916), French soldier and mathematician (and possible chess player)
Christophe Moreau (born 1971), French cyclist
Corrie Moreau, American entomologist
Daniel Moreau Barringer (1806–1873), American politician
Émile Moreau (disambiguation)
Ethan Moreau (born 1975), Canadian ice hockey player
Fabian Moreau (born 1994), American football player
Francois Moreau (1857–1930), Victorian, Art Nouveau and Art Deco sculptor; worked with Louis Auguste Moreau
Foster Moreau (born 1997), American football player
Gustave Moreau (1826–1898), French Symbolist painter and sculptor
Hégésippe Moreau (1810–1838), French lyric poet
Hervé Moreau, étoile at the Ballet de l'Opéra National de Paris
Hippolyte Francois Moreau (1832–1927), Victorian and Art Nouveau sculptor
Jacques Moreau (1933–2017), French politician
Jacques-Joseph Moreau (1804–1884), French psychiatrist
Jean-Baptiste Moreau (1656–1733), French composer
Jean Jacques Moreau (1923-2014), French mathematician
Jean-Michel Moreau (1741-1814), French illustrator and engraver
Jean Victor Marie Moreau (1763–1813), French general
Jeanne Moreau (1928-2017), French actress
Leopoldo Moreau (born 1946), Argentine politician
Louis Auguste Moreau (1855–1919), Victorian, Art Nouveau and Art Deco sculptor; worked with H. Francois Moreau
Louis-Mathurin Moreau, French playwright
Louis Moreau-Lislet (1767-1832), distinguished Louisiana jurist and translator
Lucien Moreau (1875–1932), French journalist, monarchist and member of the Action Française.
Madeleine Moreau (1928 – 1995), French Olympic diver
Marguerite Moreau (born 1977), American actress
Mathieu Moreau (born 1983), French footballer
Mathurin Moreau (1822–1912), French sculptor
Mederic Louis Elie Moreau de Saint-Mery (1750–1819), French historian and lawyer
Pierre Moreau (born 1957), Canadian politician
Reginald Ernest Moreau (1897–1970), British ornithologist
Sophia Moreau (born 1972), Canadian philosopher
 (born 1964), Belgian politician 
Stéphane Moreau (born 1971), French footballer
Sylvie Moreau (born 1964), Canadian actress
Yolande Moreau (born 1953), Belgian actress and film director
Yves Moreau, Belgian professor of engineering

See also 
Dr. Moreau, the villain of The Island of Doctor Moreau, an 1896 science fiction novel by H. G. Wells, and various film adaptations
Jeff "Joker" Moreau, character portrayed by Seth Green in the video game series Mass Effect.

French-language surnames